is the railway station in Ōmura, Nagasaki Prefecture, Japan. It is operated by JR Kyushu and is on the Ōmura Line.

Lines
Only local services on the line stop at the station. As of March 2019, a total of 37 trains per day make scheduled stops at Suwa Station: 19 in the direction of Nagasaki; and 18 in the direction of Sasebo.

Station layout 
The station consists of a side platform serving a single track. The station building is a modern timber structure which formerly housed a ticket window but which has become unstaffed. With the station building closed, there is a direct entrance to the platform via a flight of steps. A shelter and automatic ticket vending machine and SUGOCA card reader have been installed on the platform.

Adjacent stations

History
JR Kyushu opened the station on 11 March 1989 as an additional station on the existing track of the Ōmura Line.

Passenger statistics
In fiscal 2014, there were a total of 95,775 boarding passengers, giving a daily average of 262 passengers.

Environs
National Route 444
Nagasaki Expressway Ōmura InterChange

See also
 List of railway stations in Japan

References

External links
Suwa Station (JR Kyushu)

Railway stations in Nagasaki Prefecture
Railway stations in Japan opened in 1989
Ōmura Line